Dewey Lewis Hill (born August 31, 1925) was a Democratic member of the North Carolina General Assembly representing the state's 20th House district, including constituents in Brunswick and Columbus counties.  Hill is a business executive from Whiteville.

In December 2011, Hill announced that he would not seek re-election in 2012.

References 

Democratic Party members of the North Carolina House of Representatives
Living people
1925 births
21st-century American politicians